Kenaston is a village in the Canadian province of Saskatchewan within the Rural Municipality of McCraney No. 282 and Census Division No. 11. Kenaston is located on Highway 11 (Louis Riel Trail) at the junction of Highway 15 and is also near Highway 19. This is a scenic area of Saskatchewan situated within the rolling Allan Hills. Kenaston is located between Danielson Provincial Park and Blackstrap Provincial Park.

History 
First known as Bonnington Springs in the District of Assiniboia in the Northwest Territories, the settlement was usually referred to as "Bonnington". In late 1905, when Saskatchewan became a province, the name was changed to "Kenaston", honouring F.E. Kenaston, who was the Vice President of the Saskatchewan Valley Land Company.
The railroad reached Bonnington in late 1889, but there is no record of any permanent residents until 1902. In that year the Saskatchewan Valley Land Company was formed made up of wealthy men from the United States. The president was Colonel Andrew Duncan Davidson and F. E. Kenaston was vice-president.

The Saskatchewan Valley Land Company purchased  of land from the railway for $1.53 an acre and another  from the Dominion Government for $1.00 an acre. By adopting spectacular methods of advertising and employing dozens of land agents, the wide open spaces between Regina and Saskatoon were peopled with hundreds of settlers in the time between 1902 and 1910.

Needs of settlers created a necessity for business places and the settlement grew. Kenaston incorporated as a village on July 18, 1910. The Kenaston School opened its doors to its first fourteen pupils in August 1905, while the town was still officially known as Bonnington. The first store was built in 1903, the post office and hotel were established in 1904, the first telephone installed in 1909, and the first of Kenaston's grain elevator was built in 1906 by the Canadian Elevator Company. In 1910, the 40,000 gallon water tower was built by CNR in proximity to the train station and just across from the first hotel.

Demographics 

Attractions 
Kenaston hosts a sporting facility named  Kenaston Place which brings to the village the event Super Draft. Kenaston Snowman Park is near the historic water tower restoration. Kenaston's large roadside attraction is a Snowman which is 18 Feet (5.5 Metres) in height and honours the nickname of Kenaston being the Blizzard capital of Saskatchewan. Bonnington Springs is the name of the campground at Kenaston. Kenaston Recreation Site is a conservation area near Kenaston at 17-29-2-W3.

Education 
Kenaston is part of the Sun West School Division. It's also Home to the Distance Learning Center which provides education to the province through online studies.

Media 
The Davidson Leader is a newspaper which serves Kenaston.
A piece from Chilly Gonzales' Solo Piano II is named "Kenaston".
The book Kith 'n kin outlines the history of Kenaston and district.

Transportation
Canadian National Railway currently serves Kenaston; however the line terminates at Davidson where the Last Mountain Railway (Craik subdivision) begins and takes over the remainder of the line.

Notable people 

 Allan Kerpan is a politician born in Kenaston.
 Mike Prpich is a professional ice hockey player. He is currently playing 3rd line center for the Blizzards Senior Hockey team.
 Lynne Yelich is the Member of Parliament representing the federal riding of Blackstrap. She was raised in Kenaston and continues to call Kenaston home.

See also 
 List of communities in Saskatchewan
 List of villages in Saskatchewan

References

External links 

Villages in Saskatchewan
McCraney No. 282, Saskatchewan
Division No. 11, Saskatchewan